Harsh 70s Reality is the fourth studio album by The Dead C, released in 1992 by Siltbreeze.

The opening track “Driver U.F.O.” is performed over a recording of Douglas Lilburn’s “Poem in Time of War.” Side two closer “Suffer Bomb Damage” is an homage to the This Heat recording “Suffer Bomb Disease.” Stephen Malkmus of the rock band Pavement has cited the record as one of his top 10 all-time favorite albums.

Track listing

Personnel 
Adapted from Harsh 70s Reality liner notes.

The Dead C
 Michael Morley – guitar, bass guitar, keyboards, turntables, drums, vocals
 Bruce Russell – guitar, organ, drums, tape, vocals
 Robbie Yeats – drums, guitar, vocals

Additional musicians
 Joan George – vocals (C2)
 Buffy O'Reilly – guitar (A)
Production and additional personnel
 The Dead C – production, mixing

Release history

References

External links 
 

1992 albums
The Dead C albums